Mauricio Alberto Ortega Ramírez (born October 22, 1980 in Salgar) is a Colombian professional road racing cyclist, who last rode for the .

Major results

2002
 1st  Time trial, Pan American Under-23 Road Championships 
2003
 1st  Young rider classification Vuelta a Colombia
 3rd Overall Vuelta a Guatemala
1st Stage 5
 7th Overall Clásico RCN
2004
 3rd Overall Vuelta a la Comunidad de Madrid
2006
 1st Stage 4 Clásico RCN
2007
 5th Overall Vuelta a Colombia
2008
 2nd Overall Clásico RCN
1st Stage 5
 3rd Overall Vuelta a Colombia
2009
 1st Overall Clásico RCN
 4th Overall Vuelta a Colombia
2011
 1st Stage 4 Clásico RCN
2012
 1st Mountains classification Vuelta a la Comunidad de Madrid
2013
 3rd Overall Vuelta a Colombia
1st Stage 7
2014
 4th Overall Vuelta a Colombia
 6th Overall Vuelta a Guatemala
2015
 1st  Mountains classification Tour de Beauce
 2nd Overall Vuelta a Colombia
2016
 1st Overall Vuelta a Colombia
1st Mountains classification
1st Stages 6 (ITT) & 7
 1st Mountains classification Tour of Qinghai Lake
 3rd Overall Tour of China I
 5th Overall Tour of Hainan
 6th Overall Tour of Taihu Lake
 7th Overall Tour of Fuzhou
2017
 1st Mountains classification Tour of China I
 2nd Overall Tour of Qinghai Lake
1st  Mountains classification
 3rd Overall Tour of China II
 6th Overall Tour de Taiwan

References

External links 

1980 births
Living people
Colombian male cyclists
Sportspeople from Antioquia Department